The 1906–07 Haverford Fords men's soccer team represented Haverford College during the 1906–07 IAFL season, and the 1906–07 ACCL season. It was the Fords sixth season of existence. The Fords entered the season as the two-time defending ISFA National Champions and successfully defended their title.

Despite a losing record across all matches, Haverford accumulated a 3–0–1 record in the ISFA matches which guaranteed the Fords their national title, as having the best record amongst collegiate programs. Much of their losses came against local senior sides and professional cricket clubs that fielded soccer teams.

Schedule 

|-
!colspan=6 style="background:#c91631; color:#FFFFFF; border:2px solid #000000;"| Regular season
|-

|-

See also 
 Haverford Fords men's soccer

References

External links 
1906–07 Season Stats

Haverford
1906
1905
Haverford Fords men's soccer
Haverford Fords men's soccer